Quickspace (originally Quickspace Supersport) was a London-based experimental and Krautrock influenced band active between 1994 and 2005.

History
Shortly after the breakup of indie group Th' Faith Healers, guitarist/vocalist Tom Cullinan formed Quickspace Supersport with Sean Newsham (bass), Wendy Harper (vocals/guitar), Max Corradi (drums), and Barry Stillwell (keyboards) in London at the end of 1994.

The group released their debut single, "Quickspace Happy Song #1" in March 1995 on their Kitty Kitty Corporation label. They found friends in bands such as Sebadoh and Stereolab, both of whom they toured the U.K. with later that year.  A second single "Friend" was released on the "Love Train" label, though it was on the "Superplus" EP released on Domino in October 1995 where the group's sound really began to jell. A session was also recorded for the John Peel Show on BBC Radio 1. They then went into a brief hiatus when three of the original members left after disagreements over labels and money. The "Supersport" part of the name was dropped and Tom reformed the band, with Nina Pascale (vocals/guitar), Paul Shilton (keyboards), and Chin (drums).

A re-recorded version of "Friend" was the first single with the new line-up, released in early 1996 on the Kitty Kitty label. Their first full-length album, Quickspace, was released in autumn 1996, and featuring a mix of old and new recordings. A US version released in 1997 added the two most recent singles.

In spring 1997, a collection of their early singles and rare tracks was released on the low-priced compilation SupoSpot. It was followed later that year by The "Precious Mountain" EP. In the Summer of 1998 the band released the "Hadid" and "Quickspace Happy Song #2" singles and combined them both on the "Precious Little EP" CD. The band also re-recorded a version of "Friend" in Spanish for release as a single on Elefant Records. Chin left the band during this year and was replaced by Steve Denton.

Their second album Precious Falling was released on CD and double vinyl in August 1998.

In 2000, the band released The Death Of Quickspace to critical approval, followed by the "Flat Moon Society" single later that year. Tom Cullinan later released a complete cover of Fleetwood Mac's Rumours LP under the pseudonym Dougal Reed, but no new Quickspace songs materialised for over three years.

In 2003, the single was released on the Italian Homesleep label, but it would take two more years until a completely renewed Quickspace featuring Cullinan, Ed Grimshaw (drums), Louis Jack-Jones (bass) and ex-Th' Faith Healer Roxanne Stephen (vocals) released their next single "Pissed Off Boy" on the Domino label in 2005. After this Cullinan reformed Th' Faith Healers for some concerts in early 2006 but there has been no further activity under the Quickspace name.

Discography
Main albums
Quickspace (UK) (1996)
Quickspace (US) (1997)
Precious Falling (1998)
The Death Of Quickspace (2000)

Compilations
SupoSpot (1997)

Singles & EP's
Quickspace Happy Song #1 (1995)
Found A Way (1995)
Superplus (1995)
Friend (1995)
Rise (1996)
Amigo (1997)
Precious Mountain (1997)
Hadid (1998)
Quickspace Happy Song #2 (1998)
Precious Little EP (1998)
The Lobbalong Song (1999)
The Flat Moon Society (2000)
In A Field Of Nymphs (2003)
Pissed Off Boy (2005)

References

External links
 Matador Records page
 Domino Records page for Quickspace Supersport
 Domino Records page for Quickspace

Musical groups established in 1994
English rock music groups
Noise pop musical groups